Munsell is an unincorporated community in Shannon County, in the U.S. state of Missouri.

The community once contained Munsell School, now defunct.  The schoolhouse had the name of Levi Munsell, a local minister.

References

Unincorporated communities in Shannon County, Missouri
Unincorporated communities in Missouri